Håsjøen is a lake in the municipality of Røros in Trøndelag county, Norway. The lake is located between the lakes Feragen and Rambergssjøen along the river Håelva.

See also
List of lakes in Norway

References

	

Røros
Lakes of Trøndelag